Paragasponia krantzi is a species of beetle in the family Cerambycidae, and the only species in the genus Paragasponia. It was described by Stephan von Breuning in 1981.

References

Crossotini
Beetles described in 1981
Monotypic beetle genera